Viper gecko can refer to:

Hemidactylus imbricatus, the carrot-tail viper gecko, found in India and Pakistan
Hemidactylus albofasciatus, the white-striped viper gecko, found in India

Animal common name disambiguation pages